The 1925–26 Campeonato de Portugal was the 5th edition of the Portuguese football knockout tournament, organized by the Portuguese Football Federation (FPF). The 1925–26 Campeonato de Portugal began on the 9 May 1926. The final was played on the 6 June 1926 at the Campo do Ameal.

Porto were the previous holders, having defeated Sporting 2–1 in the previous season's final. Marítimo defeated Belenenses, 2–0 in the final to win their first Campeonato de Portugal.

Semi-finals
Ties were played on the 23 May.

Final

References

Campeonato de Portugal (1922–1938)
Port
1925–26 in Portuguese football